The 2014 season was the Baltimore Ravens' 19th in the National Football League (NFL) and their seventh under head coach John Harbaugh. The Ravens improved upon their 8–8 record from 2013, when they missed the playoffs for the first time since 2007. Additionally, the Ravens scored a franchise record 409 points and quarterback Joe Flacco passed for a career-high 27 touchdowns and 3,986 yards.

The Ravens clinched the sixth seed in the AFC playoffs following their Week 17 win against the Browns. After winning the AFC wild card game against their divisional rival Pittsburgh Steelers, the Ravens were ultimately defeated in the AFC Divisional Round by the eventual Super Bowl champion New England Patriots, failing to upset them on the road in a repeat of the Ravens' 2012 Super Bowl winning-season. Until 2018, this was the last time the Ravens made the playoffs, and was their first time doing so in the post-Ray Lewis era.

The season was not without controversy, however, as TMZ released a video of star running back Ray Rice punching his wife Janay Palmer then dragging her in an elevator. On September 8, 2014 after seeing the video, the Ravens released Rice.

Personnel

2014 draft class

Draft trades
 The Ravens finished with the same record and strength of schedule as the Dallas Cowboys at the end of the  season. The tiebreaker was determined by way of a coin flip at the NFL Scouting Combine, with the Cowboys selecting 16th in the first round and the Ravens selecting 17th.
 The Ravens traded their original fourth- and fifth-round selections (Nos. 114 and 159 overall, respectively) to the Jacksonville Jaguars in exchange for offensive tackle Eugene Monroe.
 The Ravens traded their original seventh-round selection (No. 232 overall) to the Indianapolis Colts in exchange for center A. Q. Shipley. || 218

Staff

Final roster

Schedule

Preseason

During the first preseason game vs the 49ers the Ravens won the third "Harbowl", as coach John Harbaugh defeated his brother Jim Harbaugh for the third time (following the Thanksgiving game in 2011 and Super Bowl XLVII).

Regular season

Note: Intra-division opponents are in bold text.

Standings

Division

Conference

Game summaries

Regular season

Week 1: vs. Cincinnati Bengals

Week 2: vs. Pittsburgh Steelers

Week 3: at Cleveland Browns

Week 4: vs. Carolina Panthers

Week 5: at Indianapolis Colts

Week 6: at Tampa Bay Buccaneers

Joe Flacco would break an NFL record for fastest time for throwing 5 touchdown passes (16 minutes) since the AFL–NFL merger.

Week 7: vs. Atlanta Falcons

Week 8: at Cincinnati Bengals

Week 9: at Pittsburgh Steelers

Week 10: vs. Tennessee Titans

Week 11: Bye Week

Week 12: at New Orleans Saints

The Ravens were the only AFC North team to defeat all of their NFC South opponents

Week 13: vs. San Diego Chargers

Week 14: at Miami Dolphins

Week 15: vs. Jacksonville Jaguars

Week 16: at Houston Texans

Week 17: vs. Cleveland Browns

With the win, the Ravens finished the season 10–6. The team also improved to 13–1 against the Browns in the Flacco-Harbaugh era. Thanks to the Kansas City Chiefs defeating the San Diego Chargers, the Ravens secured the sixth seed in the NFL playoffs.

Postseason

AFC Wild Card Playoffs: at #3 Pittsburgh Steelers

AFC Divisional Playoffs: at #1 New England Patriots

Notes

References

External links
 

Baltimore
Baltimore Ravens seasons
Baltimore Ravens
2010s in Baltimore